"Joy" is a song by British R&B band Soul II Soul, released on 23 March 1992 as the first single from their third album, Volume III Just Right (1992). It features Jamaican singer and producer Richie Stephens and was a hit in Europe, peaking within the top 10 in Greece and the UK. It also became a top-20 hit in Ireland, Italy and the Netherlands. Outside Europe, it reached number four in Zimbabwe, number 18 in New Zealand, and number 41 in Australia. A music video was also produced to promote the single.

Critical reception
Larry Flick from Billboard described the song as a "slinky funk/R&B jam that is enlivened by jazz-spiced flutes and plush string fills. Though far from the act's best material, track is head-and-shoulders above typical urban and pop radio fodder." He added that remixes by Brand New Heavies "kick hard and should inspire club play". Andy Kastanas from The Charlotte Observer deemed it "a much more mainstream sound than ever before, this new track typifies their usual sound." Marisa Fox from Entertainment Weekly noted that "Jamaica's Richie Stephens breathes some steam" into the dance-hall-style "Joy". 

James Hamilton from Music Weeks RM Dance Update called it a "lurching jiggly" track, "throatily wailed by Richie Stephens through gospel-style girls hypnotically chorusing "joy, it's a new sensation, new vibration rockin' the nation"". Cary Darling from Orange County Register said that sung by Stephens and backed by a gospel choir, the song "recaptures the motion and emotion" of "Keep on Movin'". Orla Swift from Record-Journal viewed it as "soulful". Sylvia Patterson from Smash Hits opined that it's the "jolliest tune" of the album.

Track listings
 12-inch single, US (1992) "Joy" (New Vibrations mix) – 6:43
 "Joy" (Spag 'N Joy dub) – 5:19
 "Joy" (radio mix) – 4:12
 "Joy" (12-inch club mix) – 5:49                   
 "Joy" (BNH mix) – 5:10
 "Joy" (GNL Peace version) – 5:19

 CD single, Europe (1992)'
 "Joy" (radio mix) – 4:13
 "Joy" (Brand New Heavies remix) – 5:12
 "Joy" (album mix) – 4:32
 "Joy" (club mix) – 5:50                   
 "Joy" (instrumental dub mix) – 3:49

Charts

Weekly charts

Year-end charts

References

1992 songs
1992 singles
Soul II Soul songs
Songs written by Jazzie B
Virgin Records singles